Pistyll Cain, also written as Pistill Cain and Pistill Y Caen, is a renowned waterfall in Meirionnydd (Sir Feirionnydd) in north Wales. It lies north-east of Ganllwyd off the A470 trunk road between Dolgellau and Trawsfynydd.

19th century prints
Prints made from engravings based on various artists' drawings were made of the falls in the first half of the 19th century during the Romantic period.

References

Waterfalls of Gwynedd